Elections in the U.S. state of New Mexico are held regularly.

In a 2020 study, New Mexico was ranked as the 20th hardest state for citizens to vote in.

Presidential elections 

New Mexico takes part in United States presidential elections. New Mexico has 5 electoral votes. The state has voted for the national winner all but thrice since statehood in 1912, in 1976, 2000, and 2016.

Senate elections
2020 United States Senate election in New Mexico
2018 United States Senate election in New Mexico
2014 United States Senate election in New Mexico
2012 United States Senate election in New Mexico
2008 United States Senate election in New Mexico

Gubernatorial election
2022 New Mexico gubernatorial election
2018 New Mexico gubernatorial election
2014 New Mexico gubernatorial election
2010 New Mexico gubernatorial election
2006 New Mexico gubernatorial election
2002 New Mexico gubernatorial election

See also
 United States presidential elections in New Mexico
Women's suffrage in New Mexico

References

External links
 

New Mexico elections
Government of New Mexico